Justine Henin-Hardenne was the defending champion, but did not compete this year due to a hypoglycemia.

Venus Williams won the title, defeating Conchita Martínez in the final, 2–6, 6–2, 6–1. This was Williams' 30th career title.

Seeds
The first nine seeds received a bye into the second round.

Draw

Finals

Top half

Section 1

Section 2

Bottom half

Section 3

Section 4

External links
 Main and Qualifying draws
 ITF tournament draws

Family Circle Cup
Charleston Open